Sepahijala Wildlife Sanctuary is a wildlife sanctuary in Tripura, India, of some , about  from the city centre, located in Bishalgarh. It is a woodland with an artificial lake and natural botanical and zoological gardens. It also has clouded leopard enclosures.

History 
The sanctuary was declared a Protected Area in 1987.

Wildlife 
Initiated in 1972, the sanctuary has five sections: carnivores, primates, ungulates, reptiles and aviary. The aviary has 150 species of birds and in the primates' section there are four species of primate, the rhesus macaque, pig-tailed macaque, capped langur and dusky langur. The sanctuary has been developed both as a wildlife sanctuary and as an academic and research centre. The terrain is green throughout the year and the weather is temperate except for the two humid summer months of March and April. There are several lakes.

Facilities 
There is an accommodation at the forest in a dak bungalow, called Abasarika, near the botanical garden, zoo and boating lake.

The zoo is 3-4 km inside the sanctuary.

Location 
The sanctuary is near Agartala and is spread over an area of a little more than 13 square km.

References

Wildlife sanctuaries in Tripura
Protected areas established in 1972
1972 establishments in Tripura